Đorđe Čotra (Serbian Cyrillic: Ђорђе Чотра; born 13 September 1984) is a Serbian footballer.

Career

Club
In January 2011, he joined Polish club Polonia Warsaw on two-and-a-half-year contract.

On 22 June 2017, he signed a contract with Śląsk Wrocław.

References

External links
 
 Profile and stats at Srbijafudbal
 

1984 births
Living people
People from Benkovac
Serbs of Croatia
Serbian footballers
Association football defenders
Association football midfielders
FK Vojvodina players
FK Hajduk Kula players
FK Rad players
Polonia Warsaw players
Zagłębie Lubin players
Śląsk Wrocław players
Ekstraklasa players
Serbian SuperLiga players
Serbian expatriate footballers
Serbian expatriate sportspeople in Poland
Expatriate footballers in Poland